Sandro Biasotti (born 2 July 1948) is an Italian entrepreneur and politician, former President of Liguria from 2000 to 2005.

Biography 
Biasotti is the son of an entrepreneur active in the field of freight transport and built an entrepreneurial group of the sector, with fifteen companies throughout Italy. In 1998, Biasotti decided to sell his activities to engage his entrepreneurial energies in the field of car dealerships.

President of Liguria 
Biasotti entered into politics when he ran for the office of President of Liguria during the 2000 regional election, backed by the House of Freedoms coalition. In April 2000, Biasotti is elected President of Liguria.

Biasotti is remembered for the "Battle of pesto" that, as President of Liguria, launched against the multinational food company Nestlé who was forced to change the name of some of its preserved and not fresh products, which induced to confuse them with pesto. After all the story, the Genovese basil obtained the denomination of protected origin in 2005.

Biasotti tried to run for a second term at the 2005 regional election but is defeated by the Union candidate Claudio Burlando. Biasotti challenged Burlando again in the 2010 regional election, but is defeated once again by the centre-left candidate.

At the 2015 regional election, Biasotti backed the centre-right candidate Giovanni Toti, who is elected President of Liguria.

Since 2014, Biasotti is the regional coordinator of Forza Italia in Liguria, though he tried to resign that same year after the disappointing result of the party at the 2014 European election.

Deputy and Senator 
In 2008 and 2013, Biasotti has been elected to the Chamber of Deputies with The People of Freedom.

In 2018, Biasotti has been elected to the Senate with Forza Italia and is currently serving as Senator.

References

External links 
Files about his parliamentary activities (in Italian): XVI, XVII, XVIII legislature

1948 births
Living people
Politicians from Genoa
Forza Italia politicians
The People of Freedom politicians
20th-century Italian politicians
21st-century Italian politicians